This article is about events in the year 2020 in Madagascar

Incumbents 
 President: Andry Rajoelina
 Prime Minister: Christian Ntsay

Events 
 20 March – The first three cases of COVID-19 in the country were confirmed in Antananarivo.
 16 May – The first COVID-19 death in the country, an unnamed 57-year-old medical worker who suffered from diabetes and high blood pressure, was reported.

Deaths

See also

2020 in East Africa
COVID-19 pandemic in Africa
2020–21 South-West Indian Ocean cyclone season

References 

2020 in Madagascar
2020s in Madagascar
Years of the 21st century in Madagascar
Madagascar
Madagascar